A digital effect may refer to:
 A visual effect, created for visual medium such as television or film
 A sound effect, created digitally to alter existing sounds
 A digital effects unit to alter musical instrument sound